

Incumbents
President: Pierre Nkurunziza (until June 8), Evariste Ndayishimiye (since June 8)

Events

January
January 13 - China promises to strengthen ties to Burundi.
31 January: Four journalists are sentenced to 30-month jail sentences in Burundi.

February
February 5 - Unity Day, Burundi
15 February – Six mass graves with 6,000 bodies are found in Karuzi Province, Burundi.

April
April 1 - 1st case of the COVID-19 pandemic in Burundi
April 2 - 2nd case
April 6 - Cyprien Ntaryamira Day, Burundi

May
May 14 – Four members of the World Health Organization are expelled from Burundi.
May 20 - 2020 Burundian general election

June
June 8 - Pierre Nkurunziza, the president of Burundi, dies of a stroke.

July to December
December 29 – Former president Pierre Buyoya is buried in Bamako, Mali.

Deaths
May 8 – Therence Sinunguruza, 60, Burundian politician, MP (2005–2010), Permanent Representative to the UN (1993–1994) and Vice-President (2010–2013)
June 8 – Pierre Nkurunziza, 55, Burundian politician and the ninth president of Burundi (2005–2020); Coronavirus disease 2019.
December 17 – Pierre Buyoya, 71, politician, President of Burundi (1987–1993, 1996–2003); COVID-19.

See also

2020 in East Africa
COVID-19 pandemic in Burundi
COVID-19 pandemic in Africa

References

 
2020s in Burundi
Years of the 21st century in Burundi
Burundi